"The Foundations of Decay" is a song by American rock band My Chemical Romance. It is the band's first release since their reunion in October 2019 and the first single since "Fake Your Death" from their greatest hits album May Death Never Stop You (2014). The song was written by lead vocalist Gerard Way and produced by Doug McKean alongside Way and lead guitarist Ray Toro.

Background and release 
Six years after the band's breakup in 2013, the band announced a reunion show on October 31, 2019, initially scheduled to be held as a one-off event in Los Angeles on December 20, 2019. The band subsequently scheduled further reunion shows worldwide, including a run of summer festival shows in mainland Europe and three nights at Stadium MK in the United Kingdom, followed by a further announcement of a North American tour.

In June 2021, Gerard Way revealed in an interview that he was working on music alongside Doug McKean, who engineered My Chemical Romance's The Black Parade and Danger Days: The True Lives of the Fabulous Killjoys. The song was released on May 12, 2022 without any previous announcement.

Composition 
"The Foundations of Decay" is a progressive rock, gothic rock, post-hardcore, and emo song that implements elements of doom metal, basement punk, arena rock, post-metal, and metalcore. The New York Times described the song as "prog-emo". 

The song starts with static noise, before introducing a mellow electric guitar, piano, and a "laid-back drumbeat" alongside Way's distorted vocals. It then crescendos into the chorus, with Billboard describing it as a "full-blown head banger with all the anthemic force of MCR's beloved 2006 track 'Welcome to the Black Parade.'" They also said that the song "surges between electric guitar-stamped rage fests and simmering moments of storytelling", with the song concluding in a "scream-filled free-for-all".

The track references the September 11 attacks in the line ‘He was there, the day the towers fell, And so he wandered down the road’, referencing Way’s own experience of the day which initially inspired him to begin the band.

Personnel 
Credits adapted from Tidal.

My Chemical Romance
 Gerard Way – lead vocals, producer, additional synthesizer
 Ray Toro – guitars, producer
 Frank Iero – guitars, vocals
 Mikey Way – bass guitar

Additional
 Jamie Muhoberac – keyboards
 Jarrod Alexander – drums
 Doug McKean – producer, engineer
 Rich Costey – mixing
 Jeff Citron – assistant mixing
 Mike Bozzi – mastering

Charts

Weekly charts

Year-end charts

Release history

References

My Chemical Romance songs
2022 singles
2022 songs
Reprise Records singles
Songs written by Frank Iero
Songs written by Ray Toro
Songs written by Mikey Way
Songs written by Gerard Way
American progressive rock songs